Mothavarapu Buchi Babu Naidu (1868–1908) was an Indian socialite and cricket pioneer who organised cricket clubs for native Indians. He is considered to be the "Father of South Indian Cricket" and founded the annual Madras Presidency Matches, the first of which was held shortly after his death. The annual Buchi Babu Tournament is held in his honour. Two of Naidu's sons, M.Baliah Naidu and C. Ramaswami, played for the Indian national cricket team.

Early life

Mothavarapu Buchi Babu Naidu was the eldest of five brothers born in a Telugu family from Nellore. They were adopted by his maternal grandfather, Modhavarappu Dera Venkataswami Naidu, a wealthy Balija Merchants man of Nellore, who was involved with Parry & Company and who had a high standard of living.  Naidu and his brothers were brought up in the English tradition and developed the habits and manners of well-bred Englishmen.  Naidu, who loved sports, gained the confidence to treat the English ruling classes of his time as equals.

Madras Cricket in its formative years was dominated by the Europeans.  The Madras Cricket Club was their exclusive preserve.  No non-European was allowed to enter its portals.  The Indians were peeved at this treatment.

Madras comprised today's states Tamil Nadu, Karnataka, Andhrapradesh, and Kerela under Madras Presidency. The Madras Presidency stretching from Berhampore in Orissa to Manglore and Cochin .

It took the temerity and gumption of a gutsy Desi to mount a challenge to the imperialists and show them that the natives of this sacred land could also excel in this game.

The Presidency Match

It was Modavarapu Venkatamahipati “Buchi Babu” Nayudu, known as the Father of South Indian Cricket, who conceived the idea of the Presidency Match, angered by the apartheid practised by the Madras Cricket Club, which required Indian players to sit under the tree and eat their lunch in the shade, while The Europeans enjoyed the comfort of the club's Pavilion.

The Presidency Match of Madras, played at Chepauk between 1915 and 1952, was born of one Indian's desire to meet the Englishman on equal terms on the Cricket ground and try to vanquish him.  As it turned out, the Indians won substantially more matches than the Europeans, and these were the two protagonists of this Pongal Festival of Cricket that drew large, enthusiastic audiences in the days before test matches.

It was this democratic and Patriotic impulse that drove Buchi Babu to found the Madras United Club (MUC),and dream of an annual fixture between the rulers and the ruled .with the co-operation of Henry king and P.W.Partridge of the MCC,the match known as the Presidency Match became the ‘Match of the Year 
He had been the greatest patron of Indian Cricket in Madras . He founded the Madras United Club ,and regularly achieved his ambition of defeating the white man at his own game. and admitted to its fold the conscientious desis with an unquenchable thirst and feel for the game and made them realize that their transition form mere onlookers to worthy wielders of the willow.

Buchi, with the zeal of machinery trained them ironing out the rough edges and convinced the Europeans to pit their skills against the Natives. Thus was born the Presidency Match which was played during the harvest festival, earning the sobriquet “Pongalmatch"
The first edition was opened in 1915. Thus the aspirants gained invaluable guidance to launch the career purposefully. Buchi's contribution to Madras cricket did not cease with gaining recognition for the natives.
The Buchi Babu Memorial Tournament has become a prestigious annual affair, involving India's top teams. Buchi Babu patriotically founded the Madras United Club in the esplanade .Himself a fine cricketer ,he was responsible for getting prince Ranjitsinjhi to Madras ,he was also responsible for sending Chari to England .This bowler ,who twisted and turned, earned tributes from English Cricketers .
Buchi Babu had a dream. In his days sports, including horse-racing and polo, were dominated — indeed appropriated — by the Europeans. The Madras Cricket Club was exclusively European. Buchi Babu's dream of having a ground open to everyone to play was the trigger that later made it possible for the hallowed Chepauk grounds to escape the MCC monopoly, and ultimately prepared the ground for the TNCA (Tamil Nadu Cricket Association) leasing the place and making way for the MAC Stadium that we find today.

Madras united club

A good cricketer, Naidu founded the Madras United Club (MUC) to accommodate Indian players in the then Madras Presidency. Until his time, cricket in the area was predominantly an Englishman's game, was dominated by them and was represented by their exclusive, European-members only preserve, the Madras Cricket Club (MCC). He trained those Indian players and when necessary he provided the necessary attire and equipment for promising individuals. He also arranged regular fixtures for them against the MCC, from which evolved the annual Presidency Match. This match was first played in 1908, shortly after his death but as a consequence of negotiations between him and the MCC's Henry King and P. W. Partridge. Subsequently, it was played annually from 1915 to 1952 and was commonly known as the Pongal Match because it was played during the harvest festival week. It was very popular before the introduction of Test cricket and became the Presidency's biggest fixture until the Ranji Trophy competition was started in the 1930s.

Naidu also challenged the social norms embodied in Madras cricket, such as the rule that forbade non-Europeans from enjoying the comforts of the pavilion during lunch and instead being left sitting under the shade of trees to eat lunch.

Legacy

Naidu has become known as the "Father of South Indian Cricket". His dream of having a ground open to everyone for play was the start of the process whereby the Chepauk grounds were freed of the MCC monopoly and, eventually, were leased by the Tamil Nadu Cricket Association.
Buchi Babu was proficient in riding, tennis and cricket, while his younger brother Chitti Babu was a tennis champion, and a cricketer. His three sons were all versatile sportspersons who distinguished themselves in the Presidency Match.
He had three children who followed in his cricketing footsteps: Venkatramanujalu, otherwise known as Bhatt, M .Balliah, and Cotar Ramaswami. The latter was one of the two Indian " Double Internationals". Subsequent generations of the Naidu family played Ranji Trophy Cricket, and two of the family playing at Test  level.
Cricket in madras till buchi babu changed the scenario was an Englishman's game .A few indian tried to imitate what they got a glimpse of,watching from the outfield of the Madras Cricket Club's hallowed ground at chepauk ,but the real players were the British colonialists-till Buchi babu came along and offered them an INDIAN challenge.Not only did MUC-MCC cricket matches then become regular features and the annual Pongal week .Indians vs Europeans presidency Match become the presedency's biggest fixture until the Ranji Trophy competition came along in the 1930s,But Buchi Babu tackled British custom head on and led his team in to the MCC's  ‘Whites Only’ pavilion.

References

 Buchi Babu, Buchi Babu (Father of South Indian Cricket) and his sporting clan, reproduced in Suri & Raja (ed), 1993.
 V Ramnarayan, Mosquitos and other Jolly Rovers
 

Indian cricketers
Hindus cricketers
Tamil Nadu cricketers
Cricketers from Chennai
1868 births
1908 deaths
19th-century sportsmen